Lionel Cranfield, 1st Earl of Middlesex (1575 – 6 August 1645) was an English merchant and politician. He sat in the House of Commons between 1614 and 1622 when he was raised to the peerage as Baron Cranfield.

Life
He was the second son of Thomas Cranfield, a mercer at London, and his wife Martha Randill, the daughter and heiress of Vincent Randill of Sutton-at-Hone, Kent.  He was apprenticed to Richard Sheppard, a mercer in London and went into partnership with him in around 1599.  He was introduced to King James I and VI of England and Scotland by Lord Northampton, and entered the Royal service in 1605.

In 1613, he was knighted and was appointed Surveyor-General of Customs. He was elected Member of Parliament for Hythe in 1614. In 1616 he became one of the Masters of Requests, briefly in 1618 Keeper of the Great Wardrobe and in 1619 Master of the Court of Wards and Liveries and Chief Commissioner of the Navy. As Keeper of the Wardrobe he supervised the spending of £20,000 on the funeral of Anne of Denmark and made an inventory of her jewels.

He was elected MP for Arundel in 1621. Cranfield was responsible for many economies in the public service, and his business acumen was very useful to the King. 
He took part in the attack on Lord St Alban in 1621, and although, contrary to general expectation, he did not succeed him as Lord Chancellor, he was created Baron Cranfield, of Cranfield in the County of Bedford, in July of that year. In 1621 also he became Lord High Treasurer and in September 1622 was created Earl of Middlesex.

Cranfield lost his positions and influence shortly afterwards because he opposed the projected war with Spain, and had incurred the hostility of the Prince of Wales and the Duke of Buckingham. Impeached by the House of Commons for corruption, he was found guilty by the House of Lords in May 1624 and was sentenced to lose all his offices, to pay a heavy fine and to be imprisoned during the King's pleasure. However, he was released from prison in a few days, was pardoned in the following year, and was restored to his seat in the House of Lords in 1640. Middlesex died on 6 August 1645.

Cranfield's homes included Chelsea House, which he bought in 1619 and improved employing the services of Inigo Jones and Nicholas Stone, and Copthall in Essex. Furnishings were supplied by the upholsterers Oliver Browne and John Baker who also supplied the royal court and wardrobe, and painted and gilded by Thomas Capp. These included a suite of furnishings for Anne Brett's "lying-in" at Chelsea in 1621 with a cradle with a canopy of crimson damask for James Cranfield in 1621. Furniture from Copthall was taken to Knole in 1701.<ref>Edward Town, A Biographical Dictionary of London Painters, 1547–1625', Walpole Society, 76 (London, 2014), p. 51: Edward Town & Olivia Fryman, 'A rich inheritance: Lionel Cranfield's legacy at Knole', National Trust Historic Houses and Collections Annual, Apollo (2016), pp. 35-7.</ref>

Family

Cranfield married Richard Sheppard's daughter Elizabeth in 1599. His second wife was Anne Brett (died 1670), a cousin of Buckingham's mother, whom he married somewhat reluctantly in 1621 in order to ensure Buckingham's support.

He left with other issue a son, James Cranfield, 2nd Earl of Middlesex (1621–1651), who succeeded him as 2nd Earl and was a partisan of the parliamentary party during the English Civil War. The 2nd Earl was succeeded by his brother, Lionel, who died without issue in October 1674, thereafter the Earldom of Middlesex and Barony of Cranfield became extinct.
The 1st Earl's youngest surviving daughter, Frances, married Lord Buckhurst, later 5th Earl of Dorset, and their eldest son, Charles, by then Lord Buckhurst, was created Earl of Middlesex in 1675. Two years later he succeeded as 6th Earl of Dorset, and this Earldom of Middlesex was held by the Earls and then Dukes of Dorset until 1843, when it became extinct.

Children by his first wife Elizabeth Sheppard (d. 1617):
 Martha Cranfield, Countess of Monmouth (b. 1601)
 Elizabeth Cranfield, Lady Sheffield Countess of Mulgrave (b. 1608)
 Mary Cranfield (1610–1636)

Children by his second wife, Anne Brett (d. 1670):
 James Cranfield, 2nd Earl of Middlesex (1621–1651)
 Frances Cranfield, Countess of Dorset (1622–1687)
 Lionel Cranfield, 3rd Earl of Middlesex (1625–1674)
 Edward Cranfield (b. c. 1628)
 Susanna Cranfield (c. 1631–1636)

Memorial

There is a memorial to him in the Chpel of St Benedict at Westminster Abbey.

References

Further reading
 R. H. Tawney Business and Politics under James I: Lionel Cranfield as Merchant and Minister'' (1958), Cambridge: Cambridge University Press

1575 births
1645 deaths
Lord High Treasurers
Recipients of English royal pardons
Merchants from London
17th-century English nobility
16th-century English nobility
16th-century merchants
17th-century merchants
Politicians from London
English MPs 1614
English MPs 1621–1622
Earls of Middlesex
Burials at Westminster Abbey
Impeached British officials
Impeached officials removed from office